Universities Austria (German: Österreichische Universitätenkonferenz, uniko) is an advocacy organisation that supports research universities in Austria and promotes science, art, and research. It was founded in 1911. In 2008, it changed its name from Österreichische Rektorenkonferenz (Austrian Rectors' Conference) to Österreichische Universitätenkonferenz.

Members are all federal universities in accordance with the Austrian Universities Act 2002, which are represented in the plenary assembly by their rectors. The President since January 2020 is Sabine Seidler, Rector of TU Wien. The Secretary General is Elisabeth Fiorioli.

History 
The first meeting took place in Vienna in 1911.

In addition to the internal coordination of Austria's federal universities, uniko represents the concerns of universities in national and international affairs and in the public, and is a member of the European University Association. The association signed the Berlin Declaration on Open Access to Knowledge in the Sciences and Humanities in November 2004.

Officials
The following rectors have served as chairmen and presidents of the association:
  (Universität Wien), 1945–1947
 Johann Sölch (Universität Wien), 1947/48
  (Universität Wien), 1948/49
  (Universität Wien), 1949/50
 Johannes Gabriel (Universität Wien), 1950/51
  (Universität Wien), 1951/52 
 Wilhelm Czermak (Universität Wien), 1952-1953
 Alfred Verdross-Drossberg (Universität Wien), 1953 
  (Universität Wien), 1953/54
 Johann Radon (Universität Wien), 1954/55
 Carl Johann Jellouschek (Universität Wien), 1955/56
 Johann Schima (Universität Wien), 1956/57
 Erich Schenk (Universität Wien), 1957/58
 Erwin Schneider (Universität Wien), 1958/59
 Tassilo Antoine (Universität Wien), 1959/60
 Othmar Kühn (Universität Wien), 1960/61
  (Universität Wien), 1961/62
  (Universität Wien), 1962/63
 Albin Lesky (Universität Wien), 1963/64
  (Universität Wien), 1964/65
 Nikolaus Hofreiter (Universität Wien), 1965/66
  (Universität Wien), 1966/67
  (Universität Wien), 1967/68
  (Universität Wien), 1968/69
  (Universität Wien), 1969/70
  (Universität Wien), 1970/71
 Alexander Dordett (Universität Wien), 1971/72
  (Universität Wien), 1972/73
 Siegfried Korninger (Universität Wien), 1973–1975
  (Universität Wien), 1975–1977
  (Universität Wien), 1977–1979
  (Universität für Bodenkultur Wien), 1979–1981	 
  (Universität Wien), 1981–1983	 
 Hans Tuppy (Universität Wien), 1983–1985	 
  (Technische Universität Wien), 1985–1987	 
  (Universität Graz), 1987–1989	 
  (Universität für Bodenkultur Wien), 1989–1991	 
 Alfred Ebenbauer (Universität Wien), 1991–1993	 
  (Universität Linz), 1993–1995	 
 Peter Skalicky (Technische Universität Wien), 1995–1999	 
  (Universität Graz), April to December 1999
  (Universität Wien), 2000–2005
 Christoph Badelt (Wirtschaftsuniversität Wien), 2005–2009
  (Technische Universität Graz), 2010–2011
  (Universität Salzburg), 2011–2015
 Sonja Hammerschmid (Veterinärmedizinische Universität Wien), January to May 2016
 Oliver Vitouch (Universität Klagenfurt), 2016–2017
  (Akademie der bildenden Künste Wien), 2018–2019
 Oliver Vitouch (Universität Klagenfurt), July to December 2019
  (Technische Universität Wien), 2020–

See also
 List of universities in Austria
 Rektorenkonferenz der Schweizer Universitäten, Switzerland
 Hochschulrektorenkonferenz (German Rectors' Conference)
 
 Open access in Austria

References

This article incorporates information from the German Wikipedia.

Further reading
 
  ("The Austrian University Conference (uniko), representing all 21 public universities, started a program of support for refugees called MORE, launched in September 2015 with 16 participating universities.")

External links 
Official site
 WorldCat. Österreichische Rektorenkonferenz

Universities and colleges in Austria
Educational organisations based in Austria
College and university associations and consortia in Europe
1911 establishments in Austria-Hungary
Science and technology in Austria
Arts in Austria
Establishments in the Empire of Austria (1867–1918)